Gymnobathra hyetodes is a moth of the family Oecophoridae. It was described by Edward Meyrick in 1884. It is found in New Zealand.

References

 Gymnobathra hyetodes in species-id

External links

Moths described in 1884
Oecophoridae